Gaited horses are horse breeds that have selective breeding for natural gaited tendencies, that is, the ability to perform one of the smooth-to-ride, intermediate speed, four-beat horse gaits, collectively referred to as ambling gaits.

In most "gaited" breeds, an ambling gait is a hereditary trait.  This mutation may be a dominant gene, in that even one copy of the mutated allele will produce gaitedness.  However, some representatives of these breeds may not always gait.  Conversely, some naturally trotting breeds not listed above may have ambling or "gaited" ability, particularly with specialized training. Many horses can both trot and amble, and some horses pace in addition to the amble, instead of trotting.  However, pacing in gaited horses is often, though not always, discouraged,  though the gene that produces gaitedness appears to also produce pacing ability. Some horses do not naturally trot or pace easily, they prefer their ambling gait for their standard intermediate speed. A mutation on the gene DMRT3, which controls the spinal neurological circuits related to limb movement and motion, causes a "premature 'stop codon'" in horses with lateral ambling gaits.

Such breeds include the following:

Aegidienberger
American Saddlebred
Campeiro
Campolina
Florida Cracker Horse
Garrano
Icelandic horse
Kathiawari
Mangalarga Marchador
Marwari horse
Messara horse
Missouri Fox Trotter
Mongolian Horse
Morgan horse
Mountain Pleasure Horse
Nordestino
North American Single-Footing Horse
Pampa
Paso Fino
Peruvian Paso
Racking Horse
Rocky Mountain Horse
Spotted Saddle Horse
Tennessee Walking Horse
Walkaloosa

See also
Ambling, specifically describes various four beat intermediate gaits performed by gaited breeds
Horse gait, overview of all horse gaits
List of horse breeds
The Gaited Horse (magazine)

References

Types of horse
Lists of breeds